Alkanet is the common name of several related plants in the borage family (Boraginaceae):

 Alkanet, Alkanna tinctoria, the source of a red dye; this is the plant most commonly called simply "alkanet"
 Various other plants of the genus Alkanna, may be informally called alkanet
 Alkanet or common bugloss, Anchusa officinalis
 Bastard alkanet or field gromwell, Lithospermum arvense
 False alkanet, Anchusa barrelieri
 Green alkanet, Pentaglottis sempervirens, a blue-flowered plant with evergreen leaves
 Yellow alkanet,